Woe may refer to:

Sadness or suffering
Woe, Ghana, a town in Ghana's Volta region
War of Emperium, a guild war in the MMORPG Ragnarok Online
Wings Over Europe, a combat flight simulator
WOEID (Where On Earth IDentifier), a geolocation taxonomy used by Yahoo! web services and others
An acronym for "working on excellence" made by Drake

Music
"Woe" (song), by the band Say Anything
Woe (band), an American black metal band
Woe, Is Me, an American metalcore band

Religion
Woes of the Pharisees, a list of criticisms by Jesus against scribes and Pharisees
Woes to the unrepentant cities, a list of criticisms by Jesus against the cities Chorazin, Bethsaida, and Capernaum

See also

Woe is me (disambiguation)
Woo (disambiguation)